Inclusion or Include may refer to:

Sociology
 Social inclusion, action taken to support people of different backgrounds sharing life together.
 Inclusion (disability rights), promotion of people with disabilities sharing various aspects of life and life as a whole with those without disabilities.
 Inclusion (education), to do with students with special educational needs spending most or all of their time with non-disabled students

Science and technology
 Inclusion (mineral), any material that is trapped inside a mineral during its formation
 Inclusion bodies, aggregates of stainable substances in biological cells
 Inclusion (cell), insoluble non-living substance suspended in a cell's cytoplasm
 Inclusion (taxonomy), combining of biological species
 Include directive, in computer programming

Mathematics
 Inclusion (set theory), or subset
 Inclusion (Boolean algebra), the Boolean analogue to the subset relation
 Inclusion map, or inclusion function, or canonical injection
 Inclusion (logic), the concept that all the contents of one object are also contained within a second object

Other uses
 Clusivity, a linguistic concept
 Include (horse), a racehorse
 Inclusion by reference, legal documentation process
 Centre for Economic and Social Inclusion, a former British think-tank known as Inclusion

See also
 Inclusive (disambiguation)
 Transclusion, the inclusion of part or all of an electronic document into one or more other documents by hypertext reference
 Inclusion–exclusion principle, in combinatorics